Yang family-style T‘ai-Chi Ch‘üan (Taijiquan) in its many variations is the most popular and widely practised style in the world today and the second in terms of seniority among the primary five family styles of T'ai Chi Ch'uan.

History
The Yang family first became involved in the study of t'ai chi ch'uan (taijiquan) in the early 19th century. The founder of the Yang-style was Yang Luchan (楊露禪), aka Yang Fu-k'ui (楊福魁, 1799–1872), who studied under Ch'en Chang-hsing (1771–1853) starting in 1820. Yang became a teacher in his own right, and his subsequent expression of t'ai chi ch'uan became known as the Yang-style, and directly led to the development of other three major styles of t'ai chi ch'uan (see below). Yang Luchan (and some would say the art of t'ai chi ch'uan, in general) came to prominence as a result of his being hired by the Chinese Imperial family to teach t'ai chi ch'uan to the elite Palace Battalion of the Imperial Guards in 1850, a position he held until his death.

Yang Luchan passed on his art to:
 his second son, the oldest son to live to maturity, Yang Pan-hou (楊班侯, 1837–1890), who was also retained as a martial arts instructor by the Chinese Imperial family. Yang Pan-hou became the formal teacher of Wu Ch'uan-yu (Wu Quanyou), a Manchu Banner cavalry officer of the Palace Battalion, even though Yang Luchan was Wu Ch'uan-yu's first t'ai chi ch'uan teacher. Wu Ch'uan-yu became Yang Pan-hou's first disciple. Wu Ch'uan-yu's son, Wu Chien-ch'üan (Wu Jianquan), also a Banner officer, became known as the co-founder (along with his father) of the Wu-style.
 his third son Yang Chien-hou (Jianhou) (1839–1917), who passed it to his sons, Yang Shao-hou (楊少侯, 1862–1930) and Yang Chengfu (楊澄甫, 1883–1936) and Niu Chunming (1881–1961).
 Wu Yu-hsiang (Wu Yuxiang, 武禹襄, 1813–1880), who also developed his own Wu/Hao-style, which eventually, after three generations, led to the development of Sun-style t'ai chi ch'uan by Sun Lutang.

Yang Jianhou the third son Yang Chien-hou (Jianhou) (1839–1917) passed on the middle frame long form, sometimes called the 2nd generation Yang form or the Yang Jian hou form to his disciples who still pass on this more martial form that is when seen more reminiscent  of Chen style for which it is closer to in time as well as form than the Yang Cheng fu form or 3rd generation styles.6 Yang Chengfu removed the vigorous fā jìn (發勁 release of power) from the Hand (solo) Form, as well as the energetic jumping, stamping, and other abrupt movements in order to emphasise the Da jia (大架 large frame style), but retained them in the Weapons (sword, saber, staff, and spear) forms. The Hand Form has slow, steady, expansive and soft movements suitable for general practitioners. Thus, Yang Chengfu is largely responsible for standardizing and popularizing the Yang-style t'ai chi ch'uan widely practised today.

Modern short forms

Yang Chengfu developed his own shortened "large frame" version of the Yang long Form, in order to make it easier to teach to modern students who are busy with modern life. Now the most popular long t'ai chi form in the world,  the classic Yang Chengfu form retains the health and self-defense benefits of the original 300-movement sequence in only 150 movements, most commonly divided by teachers today into 85, 88, 103, or 108 "postures" or stopping points.

The Cheng Man-ch'ing (Zheng Manqing) and Chinese Sports Commission short forms are said to be derived from Yang family forms, but neither is recognized as Yang family t'ai chi ch'uan by current standard-bearing Yang family teachers. The Chen, Yang and Wu families are now promoting their own shortened demonstration forms for competitive purposes.

As the 21st century began, the Chinese government also commissioned short 10 Forms and 16 Forms from each of the five major t'ai chi lineages. (The 10 forms are also known as 8 forms.) After these forms had been taught for several years, they were all presented as a set to attendees of the First International Tai Chi Chuan Symposium in Nashville, TN in July 2009.

T'ai chi ch'uan lineage tree with Yang-style focus

Some notable descendants of Yang Luchan

Yang Shou-chung

Yang Shou-chung (aka Yeung Sau Chung, Yang Zhen-Ming, 1910–1985) is from the fourth generation of the Yang family.  He was the oldest son of Yang Chengfu by his first marriage, and started learning his family-style when he was eight years old under the strict supervision of his father.

In 1949, he escaped from the Chinese communists to Hong Kong. There he taught many students privately at his home until his death in 1985.

He had three daughters—Tai Yee, Ma Lee, and Yee Li—and all continue to teach in Hong Kong. Over the years he had taught many people, but he accepted only three people as his disciples. These Yang family t'ai chi ch'uan practitioners are:
Master Ip Tai Tak (Yip Tai Tak, 1929–2004) in Hong Kong, who died during the spring of 2004. 
Master Chu Gin Soon, in Boston, US. 
Master Chu King Hung (朱景雄, pinyin: zhū jǐng xióng, born 1945) in the United Kingdom. Master Chu is head of the International Tai Chi Chuan Association (ITCCA).
The President of the International Yang Family Tai Chi Association is the direct Lineage Grand Master of Yang Family Tai Chi Chuan, Yang Jun.  He is the Grandson of Yang Zhenduo

Yang Zhen Duo

Grandmaster Yang Zhen Duo (1926 – 2020) is from the fourth generation of the Yang family and is officially the Fourth Lineage Holder of the Traditional Yang-style T'ai chi ch'uan. He was born in Beijing in 1926 and is the third son of Yang Chengfu. He started studying with his father when very young and continued studying with his older brothers and Zhao Bin after his father died. In 1960, Yang Zhen Duo moved to Taiyuan, Shanxi Province. Since then, Yang-style t'ai chi ch'uan has gradually spread within Taiyuan and to other cities, provinces, and countries.

Since 1980, he has served as vice-president of the Shanxi Wushu Association. In 1982 Yang Zhen Duo founded the Shanxi Yang Style Tai Chi Chuan Association, and has served as president since. The association has now grown to over 30,000 members throughout the Province and is the largest martial arts organization of its kind in China. In October 1998, Yang Zhen Duo founded the International Yang Style Tai Chi Chuan Association, serving as chairman of the board. Under his leadership, the International Association has grown to 28 centers in 12 countries with over 2,000 members. The Chinese Wushu Academy recognized Master Yang Zhen Duo in 1996 as one of the top 100 Wushu Masters in China. He has also been honored by proclamations from the mayors of San Antonio, Texas and Troy, Michigan.

In July 2009, at the First International Tai Chi Chuan Symposium, held at Vanderbilt University, in Nashville, TN, Grandmaster Yang Zhen Duo officially named his grandson Yang Jun as the Fifth Lineage Holder of the Traditional Yang-style T'ai chi ch'uan.

See also
 103-form Yang family tai chi chuan
 24-(Simplified Form) t'ai chi ch'uan
 42-(Competition Form) t'ai chi ch'uan
 Yangjia Michuan Taiji Quan

Notes

References

Further reading

Wile, Douglas Lost T'ai-chi Classics from the late Ch'ing Dynasty State University of New York Press, Albany, 1996. 
Traditional Chinese Cultural Academy, International Governing Board for Traditional Yang Tai Chi Chuan. Death of the Sifu, An Investigation of Rank and Lineage Claims''.  American Health Source Publications (2008).

External links
 Yang Family Tai Chi Chuan Association
 Yang Style Fu Zhongwen family Taichi
 Chu King-hung's International Tai Chi Chuan Association
 Tai Chi Philosophy
 Fu sheng yuan tai chi academy - India Chapter
 UK-based association offering information and instruction in Yang Tai Chi
 Gin Soon Tai Chi Chuan Federation, USA: Gin-Soon Chu, 2nd Disciple of Yang Shou-chung
 H. Won Tai Chi Institute: H. Won Gim, 2nd Disciple of Gin-Soon Chu
 Link to the website of Ip Tai Tak's (1st Disciple of Yang Shou-chung) disciple, Bob Boyd
 Ding Teah Chean (also known as John Ding), 1st Disciple of Ip Tai Tak
 Disciple of Grand master Zhu Chang Hai
 New Life Kung Fu, Teaching Professor Cheng Man-Ching, Grandmaster Huang Sheng Shyan Lineage

Tai chi styles
Neijia